New Zealand Railways may refer to KiwiRail which is the current rail services owner/operator and infrastructure owner/maintainer.

New Zealand Railways may also refer to the following companies:
 New Zealand Railways Department (also known as New Zealand Government Railways) – New Zealand national rail owner/operator until 1982
 New Zealand Railways Corporation – New Zealand national rail owner/operator (1982–1990), railway landowner (1990–2003), rail network owner trading as ONTRACK (2003–2008), railway landowner (2008–present)
 New Zealand Rail Limited – national rail owner/operator (1990–1995; privatised 1993)
 Tranz Rail – national rail owner/operator (1995–2003)
 Toll Rail, a division of Toll NZ – rail services operator (2003–2008)
 KiwiRail – national rail owner/operator (2008–present)

See also 
 Rail transport in New Zealand